The Pocloș is a left tributary of the river Mureș in Transylvania, Romania. It discharges into the Mureș in Târgu Mureș. Its name in Hungarian means "Hellish Creek".

References

Rivers of Romania
Rivers of Mureș County